St George's School is a private, Roman Catholic, co-educational school in Bandar Seri Begawan, Brunei-Muara, Brunei. It was established in 1937.

References

External links 
 

Private schools in Brunei
George's School, Brunei
Primary schools in Brunei
Secondary schools in Brunei
Catholic secondary schools in Brunei
Educational institutions established in 1937
1937 establishments in Brunei